Keene Township is one of the twenty-two townships of Coshocton County, Ohio, United States. As of the 2010 census the population was 1,690.

Geography
Located in the north central part of the county, it borders the following townships:
Mill Creek Township - north
Crawford Township - northeast corner
White Eyes Township - east
Lafayette Township - southeast corner
Tuscarawas Township - south
Jackson Township - southwest
Bethlehem Township - west
Clark Township - northwest corner

No municipalities are located in Keene Township, although the unincorporated community of Keene lies at the center of the township.

Name and history
Keene Township was organized in 1824. It was named after Keene, New Hampshire.

It is the only Keene Township statewide.

Government
The township is governed by a three-member board of trustees, who are elected in November of odd-numbered years to a four-year term beginning on the following January 1. Two are elected in the year after the presidential election and one is elected in the year before it. There is also an elected township fiscal officer, who serves a four-year term beginning on April 1 of the year after the election, which is held in November of the year before the presidential election. Vacancies in the fiscal officership or on the board of trustees are filled by the remaining trustees.

References

External links
County website

Townships in Coshocton County, Ohio
Townships in Ohio